Woodsia indusiosa is a species of fern in the family Woodsiaceae. It is endemic to China.  Its natural habitat is subtropical or tropical moist lowland forests. It is threatened by habitat loss.

References

indusiosa
Flora of China
Vulnerable plants
Taxonomy articles created by Polbot
Taxa named by Konrad H. Christ